John William Sutherland is professor and Fehsenfeld Family Head of Environmental and Ecological Engineering (EEE) at Purdue University who specialises in the application of sustainability principles to design, manufacturing, and other industrial issues.

Biography 
John W. Sutherland was born in Oklahoma City, Oklahoma, United States, to Bill and Polly Sutherland. He has a younger brother (Michael) and sister (Nancy). His early years were spent in Arvada, Colorado – the family moved to the Chicago area in 1967. He is a graduate of Hinsdale Central High School (Hinsdale, Illinois). He attended the University of Illinois Urbana-Champaign (UIUC), and received his BS and MS degrees in industrial engineering, and his PhD degree in mechanical engineering in 1980, 1982, and 1987, respectively. As a graduate student, his advisor was Richard E. DeVor.

He married his wife in 1981, they have two daughters.

Leadership at Purdue University 
Environmental and Ecological Engineering (EEE) was formed as an independent department within the College of Engineering to serve as a focus for learning, discovery, and engagement with respect to environmental engineering issues. As the first permanent Head, Prof. Sutherland has provided a strategic vision for and leadership in all EEE activities including creation of undergraduate and graduate programs and degrees, and nurturing the growth of a robust research enterprise. He oversees all EEE staff and serves as a mentor to all EEE faculty. Sutherland coordinated the development, approval, and implementation of the BS EEE degree program, which was approved by the State of Indiana in fall 2012 and is ABET accredited. He played the same role in establishing the MS and PhD degree programs in EEE, which were approved by the State of Indiana in summer 2015. Beginning with a single faculty member (the Head) in 2009, through internal partnerships and new hires, he has grown the size of the EEE faculty to 18 (2021). As of fall 2021 EEE had 172 undergraduates (So.-Sr.) and 60 graduate students. He has also guided the EEE strategies for marketing and communications, recognition programs, alumni/friend/company interactions, and development. In terms of development he has helped secure endowments for a headship, rising star professorship, scholarships, as well as other gifts.

Early career
Following the completion of his doctoral degree, Sutherland became Vice President of Process Design and Control, Inc., Champaign, IL (1987–91). PDC developed and sold software for Statistical Process Control (SPC) and Statistical Design of Experiments (DOE), delivered short courses to industry on statistical methods for quality and improvement, and provided solutions to manufacturing challenges. While at PDC also Sutherland served as an adjunct faculty member at UIUC delivering courses on SPC and DOE.
Prior to assuming his position at Purdue University in 2009, he held the Henes Chair Professorship of Mechanical Engineering and served as the Director of the Sustainable Futures Institute at Michigan Technological University.

Awards
Dr. Sutherland  is a Fellow of American Association for the Advancement of Science (AAAS) (2022), the Society of Manufacturing Engineers (SME), American Society of Mechanical Engineers (ASME), and The International Academy for Production Engineering CIRP (2011). Dr. Sutherland's awards and honors include SME Outstanding Young Manufacturing Engineer Award (1992), the Presidential Early Career Award for Scientists and Engineers (1996), SME Education Award (2009), SAE International John Connor Environmental Award (2011)  William T. Ennor Manufacturing Technology Award (2013), SME Gold Medal (2018), and AEESP Frederick George Pohland Medal (2022).

Contributions
John W. Sutherland was a pioneer in the field of environmental sustainability in manufacturing that seeks to address the root cause of environmental challenges rather than managing the symptoms. Sutherland’s research goal is decreasing environmental impacts while enhancing economic competitiveness. In 1993, Professor Sutherland and Professor Walter W. Olson created the term of "Demanufacturing", which was proposed to be used in all industries as a means reduce the environmental footprint while preserving economic viability of the processes involved. His current research areas include smart/sustainable manufacturing, circular materials economy (including recycling and remanufacturing), sustainability of bioenergy systems, green manufacturing planning, sustainability impacts, and social sustainability of manufacturing.

Contributed Books  
•	Sensory Science Theory and Applications in Foods

•	Statistical Quality Design and Control: Contemporary Concepts and Methods

•	Handbook of Environmentally Conscious Manufacturing

•	Environmentally Conscious Manufacturing

•	Renewable Energy From Forest Resources in the United States

•	Energy Efficient Manufacturing

References

1958 births
Living people
Purdue University faculty
Recipients of the Presidential Early Career Award for Scientists and Engineers